Karkus may refer to:

 The Karkus, a fictional comic-strip character in The Mind Robber
 A giant in Harry Potter
 Karkus, a character in The Lost City, a 1997 episode of Hercules: The Legendary Journeys
 , an old German name for the Estonian town of Karksi-Nuia (formerly known simply as Karksi; modern German )